Enoch N'Dengila (born 5 February 1989) is a Congolese professional footballer who plays as a striker. He has spent his entire career in the French leagues, including a spell with Dijon between 2011 and 2013 during which he made three appearances in Ligue 2.

He joined Le Mans in January 2016, and made 15 league appearances before leaving in December to "take his life in a different direction".

References
General
 Enoch N'Dengila at foot-national.com
 
 

Specific

1989 births
Living people
Footballers from Kinshasa
Democratic Republic of the Congo footballers
Democratic Republic of the Congo expatriate footballers
Expatriate footballers in France
Association football forwards
Quimper Kerfeunteun F.C. players
AS Poissy players
Dijon FCO players
US Avranches players
Le Mans FC players
Ligue 2 players
Championnat National players
21st-century Democratic Republic of the Congo people